The Paycom Wooden Legacy is an annual early-season men's college basketball competition that began in 2013. It is named in honor of basketball coach John Wooden, whose UCLA Bruins teams won 10 national championships over the 12 seasons from 1964 to 1975.

History and format
The Wooden Legacy was formed in 2013 by a merger between the Wooden Classic and DirecTV Classic. From 2013 through 2019, eight teams competed in the Wooden Legacy in a three-day, 12-game bracketed tournament, with the games televised on the ESPN Networks (ESPN2, ESPNU, ESPN3). From 2013 to 2016, the first two rounds were played at Titan Gym on the campus of Cal State Fullerton in Fullerton, California, and the final day of competition took place at the Honda Center in Anaheim, California. From 2017 to 2019, all games were played at Titan Gym. 

Beginning in 2020, plans called for the Wooden Legacy to have a two-day, four-team format, with all games played at the Anaheim Convention Center in Anaheim. The COVID-19 pandemic forced the cancellation of the 2020 tournament. The four-team, two-day tournament format instead debuted in 2021, with the semifinals and championship game televised by ESPN2 and the third-place game by ESPNU.

Brackets 
* – Denotes overtime period

2022 
 Fresno State
 Saint Mary's
 Vanderbilt
 Washington
The tournament is set to take place from November 23-24, 2022.

2021

2020 
Originally, Georgetown, Kansas, UCLA, and Virginia committed to play in the 2020 Wooden Legacy. In August 2020, the Pac-12 Conference announced the cancellation of all sports events for its member schools until January 1, 2021, because of the COVID-19 pandemic, threatening UCLA's participation; despite this, UCLA never withdrew from the Wooden Legacy. In the first round, Georgetown was expected to face Kansas and UCLA to play Virginia. In September 2020, ESPN announced plans to move the college basketball nonconference events it planned to run in November and December 2020, including the Wooden Legacy, to the ESPN Wide World of Sports Complex at Walt Disney World in Orlando, Florida, in an effort to keep players and staffs safer during the ongoing COVID-19 pandemic. The announcement prompted Georgetown and Virginia to withdraw from the tournament, and Seton Hall and Boise State replaced them. Ultimately, however, ESPN canceled all the 2020 tournaments, including the Wooden Legacy, in late October 2020.

2019

2018

Campus Site Games

2017

Campus Site Games

2016

2015

2014

2013

References

External links
Official Site

College men's basketball competitions in the United States
College basketball competitions
Sports competitions in Anaheim, California
Recurring sporting events established in 1994
Thanksgiving (United States)
1994 establishments in California